Carpilius corallinus or batwing coral crab is a species of crab.

The Batwing Coral Crab is widespread throughout the tropical waters of the western Atlantic Ocean from the coast of Florida until Brazil including the Gulf of Mexico and the Caribbean Sea. 
It is the largest crab of this geographic area, and is edible.

References

External links 
 
 WoRMS - World Register of Marine Species - Carpilius corallinus (Herbst, 1783 [in Herbst, 1782-1790])
 

Crabs
Crustaceans described in 1783
Arthropods of the Dominican Republic